Alberto Ronchey (26 September 1926 – 5 March 2010) was an Italian journalist, essayist and politician.

He was author of the term "K factor" to indicate the inability of the Western communist parties to win the elections by democratic means.

He was the Italian Minister of Cultural Heritage and Activities from 1992 to 1994 in Giuliano Amato's cabinet and subsequently Carlo Azeglio Ciampi's cabinet. He was president of RCS MediaGroup from 1994 to 1998.

Works
 Le autonomie regionali e la Costituzione. Milano, Bocca, 1952.
 La Russia del disgelo. Milano, Garzanti, 1963.
 Russi e cinesi. Milano, Garzanti, 1965.
 L'ultima America. Milano Garzanti, 1967.
 Prospettive del pensiero politico contemporaneo. Torino, UTET, 1970.
 Atlante ideologico. Milano, Garzanti, 1973.
 Ultime notizie dall'URSS. Milano, Garzanti, 1974.
 La crisi Americana. Milano, Garzanti, 1975.
 Accadde in Italia: 1968-1977. Milano, Garzanti, 1977.
 Libro bianco sull'ultima generazione: tra candore e terrore. Milano, Garzanti, 1978.
 USA-URSS: i giganti malati. Milano, Rizzoli, 1981.
 Chi vincerà in Italia? La democrazia bloccata, i comunisti e il fattore K. Milano, Mondadori, 1982.
 Diverso parere. Milano Mondadori, 1983.
 Giornale contro. Milano, Garzanti, 1985.
 I limiti del capitalismo. Milano, Rizzoli, 1991. .
 Tutelare e valorizzare un grande patrimonio: linee di azione del Governo in materia di politica dei beni culturali. Roma, Presidente del Consiglio dei Ministri, 1994.
 Fin di secolo in fax minore. Milano, Garzanti, 1995, .
 Atlante italiano. Milano, Garzanti, 1997, .
 Accadde a Roma nell'anno 2000. Milano, Garzanti, 1998, .
 Il fattore R : Conversazione con Pierluigi Battista. Milano, Rizzoli, 2004. .
 Viaggi e paesaggi in terre lontane. Milano, Garzanti, 2007, .

References

Sources
 Obituary at La repubblica
 Obituary at Il sole24ore

External links

1926 births
2010 deaths
Culture ministers of Italy
Italian essayists
20th-century Italian journalists
Italian male journalists
Italian people of Scottish descent
20th-century Italian writers
20th-century Italian male writers
21st-century Italian writers
21st-century Italian male writers
Writers from Rome
Politicians from Rome
Male essayists
20th-century essayists
21st-century essayists
La Stampa editors